This is a list of philatelic libraries.

Philatelic libraries
American Philatelic Research Library (United States)
Crawford Library, part of the British Library Philatelic Collection (United Kingdom)
Hamburg Philatelic Library (Germany)
KNBF Bondsbibliotheek (Netherlands)
Munich Philatelic Library (Germany)
Northern Philatelic Library (United States)
Northwest Philatelic Library (United States)
Philas Library (Australia)
Rocky Mountain Philatelic Library (United States)
San Diego Philatelic Library (United States)
Scandinavian Collectors Club Library (United States)
Western Philatelic Library (United States)
Wineburgh Philatelic Research Library (United States)

Institutions with philatelic libraries 
Istituto di studi storici postali "Aldo Cecchi" onlus (Italy)
Postal History Foundation, Peggy J. Slusser Memorial Philatelic Library (United States)
Spellman Museum of Stamps & Postal History (United States)
Smithsonian National Postal Museum (United States)
The Philately Museum of Oaxaca (México)
The Postal Museum (U.K.)
The Royal Philatelic Society London (United Kingdom)
Vincent Graves Greene Philatelic Research Foundation (The Harry Sutherland Philatelic Library, Canada)

See also 
 British Library Philatelic Department Photograph Collection
 International Philatelic Libraries Association
 List of philatelic magazines
 Philatelic literature
 Royal Philatelic Society London

External links